Synthetic population is artificial population data that fits the distribution of people and their relevant characteristics living in a specified area as according to the demographics from census data. Synthetic populations are often a basis for agent based models of population behavior. The later can be used for simulation of disease transmission, traffic and similar.

References

Demographics
Agent-based model